The Bombardier ALP-45DP is a type of single cab dual-mode locomotive operated by New Jersey Transit and Exo. The locomotive was designed and originally built by Bombardier, which was bought by Alstom, which will complete the second order of locomotives.

Operators

New Jersey Transit

New Jersey Transit (NJT) purchased 26 ALP-45DPs in 2008, with an option to purchase up to 63 additional units. The first locomotive from the order was displayed at Innotrans in 2010 and was officially unveiled at Pennsylvania Station on May 11, 2011. NJT purchased 9 additional units in July 2010. The locomotives from these two orders are numbered 4500–4534.

The ALP-45DPs are used on the Morristown Line, Montclair-Boonton Line, Raritan Valley Line, Northeast Corridor Line, and the North Jersey Coast Line, providing a one-seat ride into New York Penn Station. They are also used on the Main Line, Bergen County Line, Pascack Valley Line, and occasionally on Metro-North Railroad's Port Jervis Line.  They have replaced all GP40FH-2 locomotives (except those owned by Metro-North), and a majority of the GP40PH-2 and F40PH-2CAT locomotives. 

In December 2017, NJT purchased 17 additional ALP-45DPs, labelled as the ALP-45A, which will replace the remaining GP40PH-2B fleet. On June 28, 2019, Bombardier announced that the first car body from this order was inspected and approved for final assembly. In July 2020, NJT ordered 8 additional ALP-45As, leaving 29 options. The 25 locomotives are now intended to replace the majority of the PL42AC fleet instead of the GP40PH-2B fleet, due to the PL42AC's unreliability and inability to be upgraded to meet new Environmental Protection Agency standards. The ALP-45A locomotives from the 2017 and 2020 orders will be numbered 4535–4559. On December 15, 2020, the first unit from the order, #4535, has left the Kassel factory and was delivered in January 2021. #4536 was the first ALP-45A unit to enter revenue service on July 30, 2021. Following the purchase of Bombardier Transportation in January 2021, Alstom will be responsible for completing the ALP-45A order.

Exo

In 2008 the predecessor of Montreal's Exo, the Agence métropolitaine de transport (AMT), ordered 20 locomotives (with an option for 10 more), with an order value of €152 million. These units replaced the remaining GP9s, F40PHRs, and all ex-NJT equipment. The locomotives are for use on the Vaudreuil-Hudson line, Saint-Jérôme line, Mont-Saint-Hilaire line, and Mascouche line to Montreal Central Station via the  electrified Mount Royal Tunnel. They are numbered 1350-1369.

The first unit, AMT 1350, arrived in Montreal on June 9, 2011, after being shipped to Newark and then moving north to its new home.

The locomotives run in electric mode along the entirety of the Deux-Montagnes line and along the Mascouche line between Montreal Central Station and Ahuntsic station. However, with the conversion of the Deux-Montagnes line into the mainline of the Réseau express métropolitain light metro system and the permanent truncation of the Mascouche line to Ahuntsic station starting in January 2020, the locomotives will be run exclusively in diesel mode.

Design
The ALP-45DP is an electro-diesel locomotive design, based on Bombardier's ALP-46/A and TRAXX locomotives.

The challenge of fitting diesel and electric systems within the same carbody while staying within axle load limits, led to the choice of two high-speed, twelve-cylinder Caterpillar 3512C HD diesel engines rated at  each. The systems for the two engines are independentfor example, each has a separate  fuel supply (split across four total tanks owing to NJT regulations regarding tunnel operations that limit individual fuel tank capacity to )allowing the locomotive to operate on one engine in case of failure or under low load. The engines are capable of shorter startup times from idle to load (100 rpm/s) than traditional medium speed diesel engines. To achieve mass balance and distribution within the locomotive, the engines are situated on either side of the transformer, which is located in the center of the locomotive. The engines are manufactured in Lafayette, Indiana, USA.

When running under diesel power, each engine powers a MITRAC TG 3800 A alternator having an output of 1700 kVA @ 1800 rpm.

The pantograph is of TransTech design. The ABB main transformer has four secondary taps, switchable to supply 1360 V under all electrification supplies. There are two MITRAC TC 3360 DP V01 DC-AC main converters, one per bogie, which convert the single phase input to a 2,8 kV intermediate DC-bus, using IGBT based switches. Each DC bus powers two traction converters, with each traction inverter powering a separate traction motor. The locomotive uses four  MITRAC DR 3700 F fully suspended, bogie mounted traction drives to reduce unsprung mass.

In addition to taps for the traction inverters, the locomotive transformer supplies 1 100 kVA and 140 kVA for head-end power and locomotive auxiliary power. Two partially-redundant auxiliary inverters are incorporated into the two main converter units. Normally, one provides a 3 phase, 480 V 60 Hz 1100 kVA supply for head end power, while the other provides several 3 phase variable voltage, variable frequency supplies (up to 480 V 60 Hz) for the traction motor fans, transformer fans, and inverter cooling circuit motors. In the event of a converter failure, it is possible to route all supply through a single converter, ensuring redundancy and margin of error operations. 

HEP is maintained when changing power modes, due to the fact that the pantograph is not lowered until the prime movers have been started (when changing from electric to diesel), and the prime movers are not shut down until the pantograph has made contact with the catenary wire (when changing from diesel to electric). In either case, the changeover takes approximately 100 seconds. The locomotive is capable of performing a mode change while on the move; however, NJ Transit has reprogrammed their locomotives to only allow a mode change during a station stop. This is most likely to prevent the loss of power during the transition to diesel mode with a limited amount of wire left.

The braking system uses Wabtec's Fastbrake control system, with two disc brakes per axle. The mechanical parts of the brake system were supplied by Faiveley Transport. The dynamic and regenerative braking system operates under all three NJT electrical systems. In addition, the locomotive, while in diesel mode, is capable of routing power generated by the electric brake to HEP and locomotive auxiliary power requirements in addition to the dynamic brake resistor.

The locomotives are within Amtrak's A-05-1355 structure gauge and meet CFR and AAR crashworthiness standards. The diesel engines meet Tier 3 EPA emission standards, and work is being done to enable an upgrade to Tier 4 standards, which took effect on January 1, 2015.

The bodyshells of the locomotive were constructed at Bombardier's Wrocław site, the bogies at Siegen, and the alternators at Hennigsdorf factory. The locomotives were assembled at Kassel.

Gallery

Notes

References

Sources

, HTML text link via findarticles.com
, HTML link via www.raiwayage.com

External links

.
.
.

Bombardier Transportation locomotives
Electro-diesel locomotives
NJ Transit Rail Operations
Exo (public transit)
11 kV AC locomotives
25 kV AC locomotives
Passenger locomotives
Electric locomotives of Canada
Electric locomotives of the United States
Diesel locomotives of the United States
EPA Tier 3-compliant locomotives of the United States
Standard gauge locomotives of the United States
Standard gauge locomotives of Canada